Temba Tsheri Sherpa (born May 9, 1985) is a Sherpa from Rolwaling Valley, Dolkha, Nepal. On May 23, 2001, at the age of 16 years, he became the youngest person to climb Mount Everest.

The youth, who was still in school, lost five fingers to frostbite while attempting to climb from the south side in 2000. He made his successful ascent from the north side (Tibet) of Mount Everest in 2001. Temba was climbing with the International Everest Expedition.

In an interview in 2015 he noted that he had lost friends, equipment, and houses as a result of the 2015 Nepal earthquakes.

See also
List of Mount Everest records
List of world records from Nepal
Ming Kipa
Lhakpa Sherpa

References

External links 
Kathmandu Post: When it comes rolling (Article written by Temba Tsheri Sherpa 29 May 2015)
Kathmandu Post: The Saddest Season (quote from Temba Tsheri Sherpa on 30 May 2014)

1985 births
Living people
People from Dolakha District
Sherpa summiters of Mount Everest
Nepalese mountain climbers
Nepalese Buddhists